Cape Waldron is an ice-covered cape in Antarctica, just westward of Totten Glacier. It was delineated by G.D. Blodgett (1955) from aerial photographs taken by USN Operation Highjump (1946–47), and named by the Advisory Committee on Antarctic Names (US-ACAN) for R.R. Waldron, purser on the sloop USS Vincennes of the United States Exploring Expedition (1838–42) under Lt. Charles Wilkes.

Headlands of Wilkes Land